Siegfried Linkwitz (November 23, 1935 – September 11, 2018) was a German American engineer who was noted co-inventor of the Linkwitz–Riley filter along with Russ Riley.  He submitted several important technical papers to the  Journal of the Audio Engineering Society and other related publications, which have become foundational to modern loudspeaker theory. Examples of his most recent work included extensive development of dipolar loudspeaker theory. 

Linkwitz was also a contributor to electronics and "DIY" loudspeaker enthusiast magazines such as Electronics (Wireless) World, and Speaker Builder magazines. He died in 2018 at the age of 82.

References

External links 
 linkwitzlab.com

1935 births
2018 deaths
American acoustical engineers
American technology writers
German emigrants to the United States
Stanford University alumni
Technische Universität Darmstadt alumni
People from Bad Oeynhausen